The Zetland is a hotel in the town centre of Middlesbrough, in England.

The building was constructed in about 1860, as a hotel with a pub serving Middlesbrough railway station.  It was extended to the rear in 1893 by J. M. Bottomley, and then in 1898 by W. Duncan.  It is built of brick, with the front rendered to resemble stone.  The building was renovated in 2018, and includes a brasserie and bar.

The building was Grade II listed in 1988.  It also appears on the Campaign for Real Ale's National Inventory of Historic Pub Interiors.  Inside, the Victorian mosaic floor in the lobby survives, but the main interest is in the ground floor rear room, which retains its tiling in cream, brown and blue, large round-arched mirrors, and decorative plaster ceiling.

References

External links

Buildings and structures in Middlesbrough
Grade II listed buildings in North Yorkshire
Hotels in North Yorkshire
National Inventory Pubs